Currandooly Parish is a civil parish of Murray County, New South Wales.

References

Parishes of Murray County
Queanbeyan–Palerang Regional Council